Jennifer C. Ward is a British historian who is a specialist in medieval women and the history of Essex and East Anglia.

Ward is a former senior lecturer in history at Goldsmiths College, University of London.

Selected publications
The estates of the Clare family, 1066-1317, University of London, London, 1962.
The de Bohun charter of Saffron Walden, Saffron Walden Historical Society, 1986. 
The Essex Gentry and the County Community in the Fourteenth Century, Essex Record Office, 1991.  (Studies in Essex History)
English Noblewomen in the Later Middle Ages, Routledge, 1992. (Medieval World Series)
Women of the English Nobility and Gentry, 1066-1500, Manchester University Press, Manchester, 1995. (Manchester Medieval Studies) 
Women in Medieval Europe: 1200-1500, Routledge, London, 2002.  (Longman History of European Women)
Brentwood: a history, Phillimore, Chichester, 2004. 
Women in England in the Middle Ages, Bloomsbury Academic, London, 2006. 
Elizabeth de Burgh, Lady of Clare (1295-1360), Boydell Press, 2014. (Suffolk Records Society Book 57)

References 

Academics of Goldsmiths, University of London
British historians
Living people
Year of birth missing (living people)
English local historians